Jonathan David Atkinson (born 1 January 1976 in Cleveland, North Yorkshire, England) was an English footballer who played as a midfielder for Darlington in The Football League.

References

External links

1976 births
Living people
English footballers
Association football midfielders
Morpeth Town A.F.C. players
Darlington F.C. players
English Football League players